The Sandbian is the first stage of the Upper Ordovician. It follows the Darriwilian and is succeeded by the Katian. Its lower boundary is defined as the first appearance datum of the graptolite species Nemagraptus gracilis around  million years ago. The Sandbian lasted for about 5.4 million years until the beginning of the Katian around  million years ago.

Naming
The name Sandbian is derived from the village Södra Sandby (Lund Municipality, Skåne County, Sweden). The name was proposed in 2006.

GSSP
The GSSP of the Sandbian is the Fågelsång section at Sularp Brook, east of Lund (Skåne, Sweden). It is an outcrop of shale and mudstone. The lower boundary of the Sandbian is defined as the first appearance datum of graptolite species Nemagraptus gracilis in that section.

References

 
.
Ordovician geochronology